Germany participated at the 2010 Winter Olympics in Vancouver, British Columbia, Canada. 153 athletes represented Germany, entering all 15 sports. Figure skater Sarah Hecken (aged 16) was the youngest team member, while Curling European Champion Andrea Schöpp was the oldest at 44. Three time Olympic champion André Lange (bobsleigh) was the flagbearer at the opening ceremony on 12 February 2010. German athletes earned €15,000 for a gold medal, €10,000 for a silver, and €7,500 for a bronze.

Medalists

|align="left" valign="top"|

|align="left" valign="top"|

Alpine skiing

 Katharina Dürr was also a member of the German team, but did not participate in any event.
 In the super combined, run 1 is the downhill, and run 2 is the slalom.

Biathlon

Men

Women

 Tina Bachmann was a member of the German biathlon team, but did not participate in any event.

Bobsleigh

Cross-country skiing

Men

Women

Curling

Men's tournament

Men's team
Andreas Kapp (skip)
Daniel Herberg
Holger Höhne
Andreas Kempf
Andreas Lang

Fixtures and results
Tuesday, 16 February, 9:00 AM

Tuesday, 16 February, 7:00 PM

Wednesday, 17 February, 2:00 PM

Thursday, 18 February, 9:00 AM

Friday, 19 February, 2:00 PM

Saturday, 20 February, 9:00 AM

Sunday, 21 February, 2:00 PM

Monday, 22 February, 9:00 AM

Monday, 22 February, 7:00 PM

Standings

Women's tournament

Women's team
Andrea Schöpp (skip)
Stella Heiß
Melanie Robillard
Corinna Scholz
Monika Wagner

Fixtures and results
Tuesday, 16 February, 2:00 PM

Wednesday, 17 February, 9:00 AM

Thursday, 18 February, 2:00 PM

Friday, 19 February, 9:00 AM

Saturday, 20 February, 2:00 PM

Sunday, 21 February, 9:00 AM

Sunday, 21 February, 7:00 PM

Tuesday, 23 February, 9:00 AM

Tuesday, 23 February, 7:00 PM

Standings

Figure skating

Germany will compete in all events for the first time since the reunification.

Freestyle skiing

Germany did not enter athletes for the moguls and aerials events. Martin Fiala made his Olympic debut at the age of 41.

Men

Women

Ice hockey

Men's tournament

Roster

Group play
Germany played in Group C.
Round-robin
All times are local (UTC-8).

Standings

Final rounds
Qualification playoff

Luge

Germany earned the maximum quota of ten spots.

Nordic combined

Short track speed skating

Men

Robert Becker was also part of the German team but did not participate in any event.

Women

Skeleton

Germany earned the maximum quota of six spots.

Ski jumping

Snowboarding

Halfpipe

Parallel giant slalom

Snowboard cross

Speed skating

Men

Women

Team pursuit

See also
 Germany at the Olympics
 Germany at the 2010 Winter Paralympics

References

2010 in German sport
Nations at the 2010 Winter Olympics
2010